Events from the year 1535 in France

Incumbents
 Monarch – Francis I

Events
 13 January – A statute of the Parlement of Paris is enacted forbidding all printing under threat of hanging and closing all bookshops, although it is quickly abandoned.
 19 May – Explorer Jacques Cartier sets sail for his second voyage to North America with three ships, 110 men and Chief Donnacona's two sons (taken by Cartier during his first voyage).

Births
 24 February – Eléanor de Roye, noblewoman (died 1564)

Full date missing
Nicolas Rapin, magistrate, royal officer, translator, poet and satirist (died 1608)
Isabelle de Limeuil, noblewoman (died 1609)

Deaths

 22 April – Louis de Gorrevod, clergyman (born c.1473)

Full date missing
Antoine Duprat, cardinal and politician (born 1463).
Jodocus Badius, printing pioneer (born 1462)

See also

References

1530s in France